François Maronus was a Roman Catholic bishop.

Biography
On 25 Aug 1535, François Maronus was consecrated bishop by Martin de Portugal, Archbishop of Funchal with Giovanni de Rosa, Bishop of Krk, and Dionisio Zannettini, Bishop of Ceos and Thermia, serving as co-consecrators.

References 

16th-century Roman Catholic bishops in Portugal
Bishops appointed by Pope Paul III